During the 1897–98 Scottish football season, Celtic competed in Scottish Division One.

Results

Scottish Division One

Scottish Cup

Friendly

See also
List of unbeaten football club seasons

References

Scottish football championship-winning seasons
Celtic F.C. seasons
Celtic